Edwin Glenn Anderson (born March 24, 1958) from Fall City, Washington is an American politician of the Republican Party. He was a member of the Washington House of Representatives, representing the 5th district.

Personal life 
Anderson's wife is Elisabeth Anderson. Anderson and his family live in Fall City, Washington.

References

1958 births
Living people
Republican Party members of the Washington House of Representatives
Politicians from Birmingham, Alabama
People from Fall City, Washington